Henry Thomas Zebrowski, Jr. (born May 1, 1984) is an American actor, podcast host, and comedian, known for his work on the Adult Swim series Your Pretty Face Is Going to Hell, the NBC series Heroes Reborn, and the podcast The Last Podcast on the Left. He also starred in an episode of Netflix Presents: The Characters.

Life and career 
Zebrowski attended Florida State University in Tallahassee, Florida where he began to perform as a comedian, initially in the group "Oncoming Traffic", later in "Girls Aren’t Funny", which was renamed to "Murderfist", alongside his sister, Jackie Zebrowski. The group had a weekly show, in a gay bar, which became notorious for its "wild and out of control brilliance".

In 2006, Zebrowski moved back to New York City, where he continued to perform as a comedian. From the late 2000s, he had minor roles in TV shows and series such as Law & Order: Special Victims Unit and Blue Bloods. In 2010 he had a role in the drama White Irish Drinkers.

Since 2011, Zebrowski has cohosted the horror/comedy podcast The Last Podcast on the Left alongside Marcus Parks and Ben Kissel. The trio also appear on The Last Stream on the Left on Adult Swim and perform live shows internationally.

Zebrowski has appeared in both comedic and dramatic films, most notably Martin Scorsese's The Wolf of Wall Street, the Jack Black film The D Train, and the Robert De Niro/Zac Efron film Dirty Grandpa. He has made numerous television appearances, starring in Your Pretty Face Is Going to Hell since 2013; and featuring in the NBC programs A to Z and Heroes Reborn. He was also a side character in the 2017 HBO comedy-drama series Crashing and in one episode of the 2013 HBO series High Maintenance. In 2016, he wrote and starred in his own 30-minute episode of the sketch show Netflix Presents: The Characters.

Zebrowski is married to actress and ballerina Natalie Jean. The couple have been together since 2015 and have a dog named Wendy O. Jean-Zebrowski.

Filmography

References

External links 

1984 births
American male comedians
21st-century American comedians
American male television actors
Living people
American male film actors
21st-century American male actors
American people of Polish descent